Davor Rupnik (born 29 August 1971) is a Croatian football manager, who is the current manager of Belišće.

References

External links
 

1971 births
Living people
Sportspeople from Osijek
Association footballers not categorized by position
Yugoslav footballers
Croatian footballers
NK Osijek players
Hapoel Tel Aviv F.C. players
Bnei Yehuda Tel Aviv F.C. players
NK Metalac Osijek players
NK Šmartno ob Paki players
Yugoslav First League players
Croatian Football League players
Liga Leumit players
Israeli Premier League players
Slovenian PrvaLiga players
Croatian expatriate footballers
Expatriate footballers in Israel
Croatian expatriate sportspeople in Israel
Expatriate footballers in Slovenia
Croatian expatriate sportspeople in Slovenia
Croatian football managers
NK Osijek managers
HNK Cibalia managers
NK Belišće managers